Basher: The Best of Nick Lowe is a 1989 compilation album by British singer-songwriter Nick Lowe.

Critical reception
Duncan Holland of British music newspaper Music Week reviewed the album positively and named this collection "flawless".

Track listing
All songs by Nick Lowe except where noted.
 "So It Goes" – 2:33
 "Heart of the City" – 2:01
 "I Love the Sound of Breaking Glass" (Andrew Bodnar/Steve Goulding/Lowe) – 3:13
 "Little Hitler" (Dave Edmunds/Lowe) – 2:59
 "No Reason" – 3:32
 "36 Inches High" – 2:58
 "Marie Provost" – 2:49
 "American Squirm" – 2:31
 "Cracking Up" – 2:59
 "Big Kick, Plain Scrap!" – 2:31
 "Born Fighter" – 3:10
 "Switch Board Susan" (Mickey Jupp) – 3:49
 "Without Love" – 2:29
 "Cruel to Be Kind" (Lowe/Ian Gomm) – 3:28
 "When I Write the Book" (Lowe/Rockpile) – 3:17
 "Heart" – 3:42
 "Raging Eyes" – 2:38
 "Time Wounds All Heels" (Carlene Carter/Simon Climie/Lowe) – 2:45
 "Maureen" – 3:07
 "Half a Boy and Half a Man" – 2:56
 "7 Nights to Rock" (Henry Glover/Louis Innis/Buck Trail) – 2:47
 "She Don't Love Nobody" (John Hiatt) – 3:23
 "The Rose of England" – 3:26
 "I Knew the Bride (When She Used to Rock and Roll)" – 4:27
 "Lovers Jamboree" (Paul Carrack/Lowe) – 3:42

References

1989 compilation albums
Nick Lowe albums
Albums produced by Nick Lowe